Kristina "Tina" Peters (born 24 March 1968) is a former field hockey player from Germany.

Peters was a member of the Women's National Team that won the silver medal at the 1992 Summer Olympics in Barcelona, Spain. A player from hockey club RTHC Bayer Leverkusen, she competed in two consecutive Summer Olympics, starting in 1992.

References
 databaseOlympics
 sports-reference

External links
 

1968 births
Living people
German female field hockey players
Field hockey players at the 1992 Summer Olympics
Field hockey players at the 1996 Summer Olympics
Olympic field hockey players of Germany
Olympic silver medalists for Germany
Olympic medalists in field hockey
Medalists at the 1992 Summer Olympics
Sportspeople from Münster
20th-century German women